Shepardson Microsystems, Inc. (SMI) was a small company producing operating systems and programming languages for CP/M, the Atari 8-bit family and Apple II computers. SMI is most noted for the original Apple II disk operating system, Atari BASIC, and Atari's disk operating system. Shepardson Microsystems was founded by Robert Shepardson in Saratoga Springs, New York.

CP/M
The company got its start in the microcomputer arena by producing a series of BASIC programming language interpreters for the burgeoning S-100 bus computer market. Their first product was Cromemco 16k BASIC, which, as the name implies, was intended to run on Cromemco Z-series Z80-based computers with 16 kB of RAM.

As machines shipped with ever-increasing amounts of RAM, due largely to the replacement of SRAM with the much denser DRAM in the mid-1970s, SMI further expanded their version as the 26 kB Cromemco Structured BASIC, while a cut-down 12 kB version was released as CP/A Business BASIC.

At the time they were written, Microsoft BASIC was widespread but not as universal as it would be by the early 1980s. SMI's BASICs were based on the concepts and syntax of Data General Business Basic (which was very similar to HP Time-Shared BASIC), as opposed to Digital's BASIC-PLUS that formed the basis for MS BASIC. As a result, SMI's BASICs incorporated a different way to handle strings and input/output, a difference that would be seen in their later languages for the Atari.

Apple Computer
On April 10, 1978, Shepardson Microsystems signed a contract with Apple. For its money, Apple would get a file manager, an interface for Integer BASIC and Applesoft BASIC, and utilities that would allow disk backup, disk recovery, and file copying. Apple provided detailed specifications, and early Apple employee Randy Wigginton worked closely with Shepardson's Paul Laughton as the latter wrote the operating system with punched cards and a minicomputer. That deal enabled release and sales of Apple's Disk II drive.

Atari, Inc.

Atari, Inc. planned to follow up its successful Atari VCS console with a more powerful home computer (the Atari 400 and 800), to be introduced at the January 1979 Consumer Electronics Show. This required a BASIC interpreter. A version of Microsoft BASIC for the MOS 6502 had been licensed for this purpose, but the task of retrofitting the code into an 8k cartridge proved too difficult.

Atari turned to Shepardson Microsystems to help with the port, but after struggling with it themselves, they proposed developing a new BASIC instead of using Microsoft BASIC. Atari contracted with SMI not only for Atari BASIC, but the Atari Disk Operating System as well. SMI had their BASIC finished before the December 28, 1978 delivery of the contract, which included a $1000 bonus for early completion. In early 1981, SMI concluded that their BASIC and DOS products were not viable and permitted them, along with the Atari Assembler Editor, to be purchased by Bill Wilkinson and Mike Peters, who formed Optimized Systems Software. The new company enhanced the programs and sold them as third-party applications.

References

 Wilkinson, Bill (1983). The Atari BASIC Source Book. Compute! Books. .

Further reading 
 Terdiman, Daniel, "Public at last: Apple II DOS code that launched an empire", CNET, November 12, 2013

External links
 Apple Computer The Early Days A Personal Perspective
 manuals
 The untold story behind Apple's $13,000 operating system

Defunct software companies of the United States
Apple II family
Atari 8-bit family